Caffè corretto, an Italian caffeinated alcoholic drink, consists of a shot of espresso with a small amount of liquor, usually grappa, and sometimes sambuca or brandy. It is also known (outside Italy) as an "espresso corretto". It is ordered as "un caffè corretto alla grappa", "... alla sambuca", "... al cognac", or "corretto di Spadino", depending on the desired liquor.

Most Italian bartenders prepare a caffè corretto simply adding a few drops of the desired liquor into an espresso shot; however in some cases the liquor is served in a shot alongside the coffee allowing the customer to pour the quantity they desire. A few bartenders also let their regular customers make their drink themselves providing the espresso shot and the bottle of liquor.

The Italian word  corresponds to the English word 'correct' in the sense of 'corrected'. The term is now an Italian phraseme.

Caffè corretto can also be found widely in Eritrea, a legacy of the Italian colonization of Eritrea. Asmarino bartenders pour locally produced areki and cognac.

In Spain, a similar drink is known as carajillo; in Portugal it is known as café com cheirinho (coffee with scent); in France café-calva (coffee and Calvados); and in Sweden, Norway, and Denmark as kaffekask, karsk, or kaffegök.

Variants

Rexentìn 
The "Rexentin" (or "Raxentin", as it is known in some places) is a tradition of the Italian region of Veneto. "Rexentin" means "to rinse": after drinking the caffè corretto a small quantity of coffee remains in the cup, which is cleaned using the liquor used for the beverage, that will then be drunk.

See also

Irish coffee
Liqueur coffee

References

Italian drinks
Alcoholic coffee drinks
Coffee in Italy

it:Caffè espresso#Caffè corretto